Drive You Home Again is an album by American singer/songwriter Chris Smither, released in 1999.

Reception

Writing for Allmusic, critic Jeff Burger wrote of the album "Smither's gravelly, instantly recognizable voice is a perfect fit for his pensive, sharply honed lyrics and his blues and folk-based music... Like Nick Drake and the Van Morrison of Astral Weeks days, Smither makes you feel as if you're in a dream. You may not want to wake up for a while." Music critic Robert Christgau wrote "...you'd never suspect he was a moral philosopher. But in fact he is that even rarer thing, a moral philosopher with good values, and here his songwriting takes over a career marked by killer covers... he thinks on his butt while keeping the beat with his foot. He's worth attending even if you think blues are history."

Track listing
All songs by Chris Smither unless otherwise noted.
 "Drive You Home Again" – 5:28
 "Tell Me Why You Love Me" – 3:55
 "No Love Today" – 4:57
 "Hey, Hey, Hey" – 4:04
 "Get a Better One" – 5:22
 "Hold On II " – 3:24
 "So Long" – 4:48
 "Duncan & Brady" (Traditional)– 3:52
 "Steel Guitar" (Danny O'Keefe) – 3:38
 "Don't Make Promises" (Tim Hardin) – 3:25
 "Rattlesnake Preacher" (Eric Von Schmidt) – 3:24

Personnel
Chris Smither – vocals, guitar
Joel Jose Guzman - Accordion, keyboards, melodica
John Mills - saxophone
Marty Muse - pedal steel guitar
Chris Maresh - bass
Mickey Raphael - harmonica
Raul Rodriguez - tuba
Brannen Temple - drums, percussion
Malford Milligan - background vocals

Production
Produced by Stephen Bruton
Mixed by Chet Himes
Engineered by Jay Hudson
Mastered by Jerry Tubb

References

1999 albums
Chris Smither albums